The 2010–11 SAFA Second Division season, also known as Vodacom League due to a sponsoring deal, took place in South Africa between the months of September and May. The league is the third tier of South African football, and is divided geographically into 5 divisions in the Coastal Stream and 4 divisions in the Inland Stream.

Coastal Stream

Eastern Cape Province 

Leaving for 2011-12: Young Stars (relegated), Royals (relegated).
Joining for 2011-12: Two promoted teams from SAB Regional League.

Free State Province 

Leaving for 2011-12: Mangaung City (relegated), Harrismith United (relegated).
Joining for 2011-12: Two promoted teams from SAB Regional League.

KwaZulu-Natal Province 

Leaving for 2011-12: Abaqulusi (relegated), Bright Stars (relegated).
Joining for 2011-12: Two promoted teams from SAB Regional League.

Northern Cape Province

Leaving for 2011-12: Kakamas Cosmos (relegated), Amalawus (relegated).
Joining for 2011-12: Two promoted teams from SAB Regional League.

Western Cape Province 

Leaving for 2011-12: Chippa United (promoted), Battswood (relegated), WP United (relegated).
Joining for 2011-12: Hanover Park (relegated), Two promoted teams from SAB Regional League.

Inland Stream

Gauteng Province 

Leaving for 2011-12: Real Barcelona (relegated), Lesedi Shooting Stars (relegated).
Joining for 2011-12: Two promoted teams from SAB Regional League.

Limpopo Province 

Leaving for 2011-12: Karee Young Stars (relegated), Phalaborwa Real Rovers (relegated).
Joining for 2011-12: Super Eagles (promoted), Davhana Shooting Stars (promoted).

Mpumalanga Province 

Leaving for 2011-12: Sivutsa Stars (promoted), Mologadi (relegated), Secunda Stars (relegated).
Joining for 2011-12: Batau (relegated), Two promoted teams from SAB Regional League.

North-West Province 

Leaving for 2011-12: Oxygen (relegated), Mothupi Birds United (relegated).
Joining for 2011-12: Two promoted teams from SAB Regional League.

Provincial winners decided by appeal cases
The first 4 out of 9 provincial winners, were decided without any appeal case being involved, after the last round of Vodacom League in April 2011. For the other five divisions in Eastern Cape, Northern Cape, Free State, Limpopo and North-West, the provincial winners were only found by 5 June, after the SAFA disciplinary committee and Sports Court had judged one or several appeal cases in each division. The list below summarizes the outcome of all those cases.

 In the Eastern Cape division: An appeal was filed by runner-up Tornado (62p), asking SAFA to deduct FC Buffalo (68p) minimum 6p, for the alleged use of an ineligible player. This appeal was however rejected by SAFA.
 In the Northern Cape division: The appeal was about the initial 2-2 result, of a match played between the two log leaders Real Madrid (75p) and Steach United (74p). If SAFA had decided to award a "disciplinary defeat" for Real Madrid, then it would have been Steach United to be crowned as divisional winner. The decision however was, to let the result achieved on the playing field stand, and thus Real Madrid managed to win the division with 1p ahead of Steach United.
 In the Free State division: The first important appeal concerned an undecided match, between the runner-up Botshabelo against one of the other teams in the division. As Botshabelo managed to win their appeal, they gained 3 additional points and thus moved up to become the new winner of the division, ahead of Roses United. At the same time, Roses United however had appealed their 2–1 defeat against Sasolburg Juventus, asking for the result to be changed into a victory for Roses United, due to the match being unfairly abrupt after 75 minutes, when several rugby fans suddenly invaded the pitch. This last appeal was upheld by SAFA, awarding a 2–0 victory to Roses United, and thus they managed to win the division ahead of Botshabelo.
 In the Limpopo division: After Baroka had won the division by 15p over Winners Park, the runner-up lodged an appeal claiming Baroka had fielded an ineligible player, and thus should be deducted minimum 15 points. This appeal was however rejected by SAFA.
 In the North-West division: All top-3 teams were each involved in two or three appeal cases. As Soshanguve Sunshine did not win any of their appeals, while the other two teams each managed to win one of their appeals, the log ended at 15 May, with Garankuwa United (63p) as 1st, NW Shining Stars (62p) as 2nd, and Soshanguve Sunshine (61p) as 3rd. Around 31 May, the appeal drama was however reignited, as two of the previously solved cases involving NW Shining Stars, result-wise were reverted to "a pending matter". The two unsolved appealed matches for the team, was a 2–0 win against Oxygen from 16 April, and a 2–3 defeat against Real Stars from 26 February. The Sports Court made a final decision at 1 June, to upheld the result of the first match, and award a new 2-0 result for NW Shining Stars in the second match against Real Stars; as the former result was ruled to be "unfairly achieved". Thus, the arbitration by the Sports Court, had now moved NW Shining Stars up at 65p in the log, which at this point of time meant, that they were now at a position to win the division. SAFA however announced at 2 June, that the team now also was involved in a third appeal. This time it was Soshanguve Sunshine pushing forward a final appeal to the Sports Court, to overrule the initial disciplinary decision by SAFA, for the imposed 0–2 defeat against NW Shining Stars. The case arose after allegations by NW Shining Stars, that Soshanguve Sunshine had fielded an unregistered player (Benjamin Nthethe) in the match between the two log leaders at 19 March, and thus had achieved their victory at the playing field by unfair means. SAFA initially agreed. If the Sports Court decide to nullify SAFAs decision, it will however mean, that the initial win for Soshanguve Sunshine will stand. In that case, Soshanguve will be crowned as the final winner of the division, with a total of 64p in the log, while NW Shining Stars has to settle with only 62p and a second place. If the court settle the case between the two opponents as a draw -i.e. due to disciplinary violations committed by both teams in the match-, then we have a tight situation, with Garankuwa United taking the final win of the division, with 63p and a better goal score than NW Shining Stars. The result of this last appeal was apparently decided at 5 June, with Garankuwa as the new final winner of the division. No references have yet been published to confirm the exact details about the final decision of the Sports Court.

Playoff stage
At the playoff stage, a round robin format with two groups, comprising respectively the 5 provincial winners from the Coastal stream and the 4 provincial winners from the Inland stream, were set to decide the two promoting teams for the National First Division. A final match to decide the overall Vodacom League champion, will finally also be arranged between the two promoted group winners. The playoffs were planned to take place at 7–12 June 2011 in Cape Town, at the venues Erica Park and Philippi Stadium. Upon inspection of the fields at 6 June, the quality at Erica Park was however found to be inadequate. SAFA therefore decided, instead to organise all matches at Philippi Stadium and the nearby UWC Stadium.

Group A (Coastal)

Match results:

Group B (Inland)

Match results:

Playoff Final

Playoff honours
A number of awards were issued at the concluding ceremony.

References

External links
SAFA Official Website -database with results of Vodacom League

2010-11
3
South